Bayside United FC is an Australian football (soccer)  club from Lota, an eastern suburb of Brisbane. The club was formed in 1974, and currently competes in Brisbane Premier League. When the club celebrated its 40th anniversary in 2014 it had over 500 members and more than 440 registered junior players.

History
The Lota Recreation Club in 1954 was started by Horrie Stephens and Bert Taylor who coached the Lota State School football teams in 1953, which gave them the idea of starting a sporting club at Cox Park. The idea of starting the club as also in conjunction with other locals Arthur Lachlan, George Parsons and Alan Cronshaw. The team colours of Gold & Black were from English football club Wolverhampton Wanderers, with written permission having to be sought to use them. The club also offered Netball and Badminton at the time.

Bayside United FC was formed in 1974, arising out of the Bayside United Sports and Recreation Club which had been providing local children with the chance to play organised sports, including soccer since 1954. In the early 1970s, the local PCYC took over the running of all the sports other than soccer which remained with the sports club and was renamed the Wondall United Soccer Club until 1973. Bayside United FC built upon these beginnings after its establishment in 1974, expanding the club so that it was able to join the mainstream Brisbane soccer competitions.

For its first ten years, Bayside United played at Cox Park in Richard Street, Lota. The club moved to its current home at Don Randall Oval, Lota in 1984.

Bayside United’s first recorded season at senior level was in 1977 when the club finished second and achieved promotion from Brisbane’s Division Six. The club rose through the divisions to Division Two in 1983, but was relegated after a single season. By 1989, the club was back in Division Six, but won its first premiership the following season, achieving 16 wins from 20 matches. Since 1990 Bayside United has slowly risen through the divisions, being relegated just once in 1999.

Between 2003 and 2007, Bayside United spent five seasons in Metro League Division One, the fourth tier of Brisbane football. The club lost grand finals against Souths United in both 2005 and 2007, and finished second in 2006 but were suspended from the finals series. Bayside United won Metro League Division One in 2007 with 16 wins, 2 draws and 2 losses from 20 games and were promoted to Premier Division Two.

Five seasons in Premier Division Two culminated in winning the minor premiership and promotion in 2012, which coach Ben Ryan said achieved the club’s priority for the season. The club was still disappointed to lose another grand final, this time in a penalty shoot-out to Annerley. The club’s Premier Division Two reserves team did win the double in 2012, winning the premiership, and the grand final 3-1 against Holland Park Hawks FC .

In 2013, the club finished runners-up in Capital League 1 to the undefeated Mitchelton team, and in a normal season would have been promoted to the Brisbane Premier League, however there was no promotion for this season only, and Bayside United missed the chance to play in the top flight of Brisbane football for the first time. In 2014, Bayside United finished third and lost another grand final on penalties, this time to Taringa Rovers .

Bayside United remain in Capital League 1 after they finished 10th in 2015 and avoided relegation by five points, and then achieved a mid-table finish in 2016.

Bayside United currently compete in Football Queensland Premier League 3 - Metro as of 2021. Bayside won the FQPL3 Grand Final in 2021 beating Albany Creek Excelsior on penalties.

Recent seasons

The tier is the level in the Australian soccer league system

Current squad

Technical staff

Honours

Brisbane Division 6 – Premiers 1990
Metro League Division 1 – Premiers 2007
Premier Division 2 – Premiers 2012
Brisbane Premier League - Champions 2021
FQPL3 Grand Final Runners-Up 2022

References

External links
 

Soccer clubs in Brisbane
Association football clubs established in 1974
1974 establishments in Australia
Lota, Queensland